John Arthur may refer to:
John Arthur (cricketer) (1847–1877), cricketer for Tasmania
John Arthur (Australian politician) (1875–1914), Australian Minister for External Affairs
John Arthur (Ghanaian politician)
John Arthur (missionary) (1881–1952), medical missionary and Church of Scotland minister 
Johnny Arthur (1883–1951), American stage and motion picture actor
John Arthur (philosopher) (1946–2007), American ethicist and philosophy professor
John Arthur (boxer) (1929–2005), South African boxer
John Arthur (rugby union) (1848–1921), Scottish rugby football player
John R. Arthur Jr., American materials scientist
John Dada Arthur (born 1994), Ghanaian footballer

See also
Jon Arthur (1918–1982), host of the Saturday morning children's radio series Big Jon and Sparkie
Jon Arthur (radio host)